The Bold Caballero is a 1936 American Western film written and directed by Wells Root. It is based on the character Zorro, created by Johnston McCulley. The characters Don Alejandro Vega (Don Diego's father) and Bernardo are notably absent. Native American stars include Chief Thundercloud as Don Diego Vega/Zorro's aide and Charles Stevens as Captain Vargas. John Merton appears uncredited in this film as a First Sergeant. Merton also appears in Zorro's Fighting Legion as Manuel and Zorro's Black Whip as Harris. The film is notable for being the first talking Zorro film, as the first two Zorro films were silent films, and the first Zorro film in color (Magnacolor). It was shot in Chatsworth, Los Angeles. The film was released on December 1, 1936, by Republic Pictures.

Plot 
Zorro (Robert Livingston) has been captured and set for execution, charged with the murder of the new Governor (Robert Warwick) in Spanish California, as the governor was marked with a "Z". Zorro escapes, and reveals his identity to the governor's daughter, Isabella (Heather Angel). However, Isabella then has Don Diego arrested. He convinces Isabella that the Commandante (Sig Ruman) was the real killer, as the "Z" on the Governor was backwards. Eventually, Isabella helps free Don Diego, the Commandante is killed, and Diego and Isabella are reunited.

Cast
Robert Livingston as Don Diego Vega/Zorro
Heather Angel as Lady Isabella Palma
Sig Ruman as Commandante Sebastian Golle 
Ian Wolfe as The Priest
Robert Warwick as Governor Palma
Emily Fitzroy as Lady Isabella's chaperone
Charles Stevens as Captain Vargas
Walter Long as Guard
Ferdinand Munier as Landlord
Chris-Pin Martin as Hangman 
Carlos De Valdez as The Alcalde 
Soledad Jiménez as Indian woman

References

External links

 
 

1936 films
1936 Western (genre) films
1930s color films
American Western (genre) films
Films produced by Nat Levine
Films shot in Los Angeles
Republic Pictures films
Zorro films
1936 directorial debut films
Films scored by Karl Hajos
Films based on works by Johnston McCulley
1930s American films
1930s English-language films